Asia Pop 40 is the first regional weekly chart countdown radio show produced in Asia specifically for Asian radio. There is an English language version as well as a Mandarin version.

Each week Asia Pop 40 counts down the most popular songs across Asia, combining Apple Music charts from multiple markets to produce a pan-regional radio programme.

Originally hosted by Dom Lau (Dominic Lau), the popular show is now hosted by Joey Chou of ICRT (English) and Max Lim (Mandarin), the show plays the most popular music as well as segments including artist interviews, AP40 Hit Predictions, BuzzzTrack, Alternative Choice Tracks, Bonus Tracks and BackTrack.

Asia Pop 40 is currently broadcast in over 90 countries across Asia, including in Australia and New Zealand on iHeartRadio.

Broadcasting Times

English version

Mandarin version (China only) 
The schedule was currently unknown due to content restrictions.

References

External links
Official Website

2013 radio programme debuts
Music chart shows